Ethylene chloride is a chemical name that can refer to either of the following compounds: